The seedeaters are a form taxon of seed-eating passerine birds with a distinctively conical bill. 

Most are Central and South American birds that were formerly placed in the American sparrow family (Passerellidae), but are now known to be tanagers (Thraupidae) closely related to Darwins finches. Indeed, some of the birds listed here seedeaters are closer to these "finches", while the more "true" seedeaters form a clade with some tanagers. A few "atypical" seedeaters are closely related to certain tanagers, many of which (such as the flowerpiercers) have peculiarly adapted bills.

In addition, there are some African passerines called seedeaters. They belong to the serin genus (Serinus) of the true finch family (Fringillidae), but might need to be separated with their closest relatives in Crithagra.

American seedeaters

True seedeaters
 Amaurospiza – blue seedeaters (4 species, tentatively placed here)
 Dolospingus – white-naped seedeater
 Oryzoborus – seed-finches (6 species, sometimes included in Sporophila)
 Sporophila – typical seedeaters (some 30 species, 1 possibly recently extinct)

Related to Darwin's finches
 Euneornis – orangequit
 Loxigilla – Antillean bullfinches (4 species)
 Loxipasser – yellow-shouldered grassquit
 Melanospiza – St. Lucia black finch
 Melopyrrha – Cuban bullfinch
 Tiaris – typical grassquits (5 species)

Atypical seedeaters
 Acanthidops – peg-billed finch 
 Catamenia (3 species)
 Haplospiza (2 species)

Relatives of true seedeaters

These tanagers are the true seedeaters' closest relatives:
 Charitospiza – coal-crested finch
 Lophospingus (2 species)
 Sicalis – yellow-finches (12 species)
 Volatinia – blue-black grassquit

African seedeaters

 Southern yellow-rumped seedeater, Serinus atrogularis
 Thick-billed seedeater, Serinus burtoni
 Lemon-breasted seedeater, Serinus citrinipectus
 Yellow-throated seedeater, Serinus flavigula
 Streaky-headed seedeater, Serinus gularis
 Protea seedeater, Serinus leucopterus
 White-rumped seedeater, Serinus leucopygius
 Black-eared seedeater, Serinus mennelli
 Reichard's seedeater, Serinus reichardi
 Principe seedeater, Serinus rufobrunneus
 Streaky seedeater, Serinus striolatus
 Brown-rumped seedeater, Serinus tristriatus
 Abyssinian yellow-rumped seedeater, Serinus xanthopygius

External links
Fringillidae and Emberizidae videos, photos & sounds on the Internet Bird Collection

 
Bird common names